Sekolah Menengah Kebangsaan All Saints is a single-session secondary school located in Jalan Teluk Likas of Kota Kinabalu, Sabah, Malaysia. It is also known as All Saints Secondary School and SM All Saints for short. The school was opened in 1903 when Kota Kinabalu was known as Jesselton, making it one of the oldest schools in Kota Kinabalu.

The current principal of the school is Dr. Mary Gambidau. The school is recognised as one of the leading secondary schools in the state. All Saints has been ranked amongst the highest-achieving schools in Sabah.

The school's motto is"Quod Facimus Id Perficimus" which means "What We Do We Carry Through" in Latin.

History
All Saints Secondary School is a part of the Anglican Diocese of Sabah. The development of Anglican Church schools was inspired by foreign settlers to provide education to their children. The Diocese also owns other secondary schools, primary schools and kindergartens in Sabah and also in West Malaysia.

Early days
All Saints was built on 1 April 1903 as one of the earliest schools in Kota Kinabalu (Jesselton). Its humble beginning was in a borrowed government building that served as an office. The school was officially declared open by Governor E.W. Birch and Lady Birch on 22 December 1903 and it was named King Edward VII School after the reigning King of Great Britain.

King Edward VII School at that time, under the charge of Mr. Chai Ah Soon, was basically a one-man show, for he doubled as the headmaster and form teacher. It started with only about 30 students, all boys and mostly Chinese, and they were divided into five groups ranging from standard one to five. The students learned simple arithmetic, English grammar, reading, writing and Bible study. On 25 May 1905, the boys of the school were invited to participate in sports events organized by the police department. This marked the beginning of sports in the school.

Move to Karamunsing
As the principal and class teacher, Mr. Chai Ah Soon's main concern was undoubtedly on the academics. But the school was multi-functional. It was also used to hold church services. Besides, meetings and social functions were held in King Edward VII School as it was difficult to find suitable premises in Jesselton for these purposes. Later, on 1 September 1909, King Edward VII School was moved to a land at Karamunsing, granted by the Court of Directors of the British North Borneo Company. The site of the school was moved to Karamunsing in 1910. The new school was built of wood, on stilts over the swamp.

The birth of All Saints School
World War I (1914-1918) had a big impact on King Edward VII School. The government had to stop its financial assistance and parents were unable to pay for the schooling expenses. Thus, the school board temporarily closed the school. On 1 February 1923, Rev. C. J. Collis reopened the school and renamed it as All Saints School, after the church where he served. He was the headmaster of the school then. In 1923, the 1st Jesselton (Scout) Patrol was formed by Rev. C. J. Collis in All Saints School. Boarding facilities became available in All Saints on 1 May 1930. In December 1934, Cambridge University Local Examinations were held in All Saints School for the first time in Jesselton.

Move to Likas
During World War II (1939-1945), All Saints School had to be closed again. But it was reopened in 1947 and received many enrolments from other towns. In October 1947, All Saints' School was registered as a primary school with secondary classes (19 students in secondary one and seven students in secondary two). In that same year, it was reopened as a co-educational school. In 1951, it reverted to boys-only. With the growing number of students, All Saints had to move again to a new location in Likas. In June 1953, the Governor of North Borneo, Sir Ralph Hone laid the foundation stone for building All Saints' one-storey block. The building was officially declared open on the 1 July 1954 by Sir Roland Turnbull. By the year 1954, girls were admitted to the secondary classes that were previously monopolized by the boys. The boys' hostel was built in 1955 and a second hostel was built in 1963 for a growing number of students from other parts of Sabah.

Growth
All Saints was the first school in Sabah to teach pure science for Form 4 and 5 in 1958 and also the first to have a pure science laboratory which is the Chemistry Lab. In 1959, the Cambridge Local Examinations Committee granted the school 'A' status; this gave it the right to conduct its own practical examination in science. It was the first school in Sabah to attain this status. In 1962, Bridge class and Form 6 were introduced. All Saints was the first school to start the Form 6 arts class.

Between 1958 and 1967, the school had better facilities like laboratories, a new double-storey Domestic Science Block, a classroom and a library.

Meanwhile, there was a growing demand for classrooms and facilities, as the enrolment of the school increased substantially each year.

School house
The school has a house system with five sports-oriented houses, Rusted, Collier, Paisley, Henthorne and Leggatt. The first four of are named after former school headmasters, whereas the last was named after an unknown former student of the school, who had the nickname "Boss Leggatt".

Progress
On 15 August 1982, Mr. Teo Then Wah became principal of All Saints. During his tenure, a new multi-purpose hall was envisioned. The ground-breaking ceremony was held on 28 August 1983 by Rev. Cannon E.C.W. Rusted, OBE, MA. On the same day, the foundation stone of the new multipurpose hall was laid by the Anglican Bishop of the Diocese of Sabah, Rt. Rev. Datuk Luke H.S. Chhoa. On 8 November 1986, the occupation certificate of the All Saints hall was handed to Rev. Canon Lee by the president of City Council of Kota Kinabalu, Datuk Peter D. Cheong. During Mr. Teo's time in office, a five-storey block was built. Fund-raising activities for the building were initiated by the school's alumni association.

On 14 October 1992, the ground-breaking ceremony was officiated by then-state cabinet minister, Datuk Wilfred Bumburing.

Simultaneously, the Anglican Bishop of the Diocese of Sabah, Rt. Rev. Datuk Yong Ping Chung also laid the foundation stone for the new building.

On the same day, Datuk Wilfred and Bishop Yong unveiled a plaque, to mark the start of construction work the building. The five-storey classroom block was completed in June 1995.

It was named Wisma All Saints. It houses the school's staff room, a library on the top floor, a canteen on the ground floor and science laboratories on the first floor. The handling of the Occupation Certificate was held on 19 December 1995.

Mr. Teo Then Wah retired on 10 September 2000; he was the longest-serving principal in All Saints' history.

21st century
Mr. Ronnie Khoo became principal in 2001. Under his term, All Saints produced winners in many inter-school competitions such as the Sabah Inventors Exhibition, National Science Quiz and Inter-Schools Science Competitions. Mr. Khoo returned the school to its traditional past, reintroducing the school song and emphasizing English as the medium of conversation.

The school's first headmistress
The school's first lady principal, Datin Lorna Mathews, served the school in 2003, when it celebrated its 100th anniversary. During her tenure the administration office and the staff rooms were renovated and expanded. She also developed the Form 6 Block, the workshop, the school archive, the conference room, the chapel, the new grandstand, the covered walkway and the installation of the closed-circuit television camera (CCTV). She upgraded all of the students' and teachers' washrooms, the classrooms, the floor tiling and improved the school landscape. In addition, she had initiated Form 6 Graduation Ceremony and made the Prefects Installation Ceremony a special function on its own.

Current and former principals

Pre-war (1903–1941)

Post-war (1947–present)

Academics
The school offers basic and advanced secondary courses. Students have the core classes of maths, science, Malay language, English, history, Islamic education (for Muslim students), and moral education (for non-Muslim students). Non-core classes such as geography, physical and health education, visual arts, music, living skills, Chinese, Kadazan-Dusun and Tamil languages are also offered to the students as elective and optional subjects.

Students in the higher secondary however, are offered elective classes according to their chosen streams. Elective classes include Add Maths, biology, chemistry, physics, accountancy, etc. Students in All Saints Pre-University (Form 6) will enrol as Lower 6 students then re-enrol as Upper 6 students. Form 6 students are offered the Science stream and Arts stream.

Co-curriculum
All students are required to participate in at least two co-curricular activities. Many clubs and organizations are offered and they fall into the following categories: Uniformed Groups, Performing Arts, Clubs & Societies, and Sports & Games. Competitions and performances are regularly held.

School magazine
The Saint

The first school magazine, The Saint, was published in 1952. In 1957, the Rotary Club of Jesselton donated a second-hand printing press to the school and a large quantity of type blocks was donated by a firm in Sheffield, England. The school printed its own magazine from then till 1969. Presently, the school magazine has become the school's yearbook and selected students are assigned to the Editorial Board to publish the yearbook.

Annual events

Excellence Award Ceremony 
The annual All Saints School Excellence Award Ceremony recognises students who have excelled in both academic and co-curricular activities. This includes students who have made outstanding academic achievements in various subjects in the school examinations as well as school athletes who represented the school in both national and international competitions.

Furthermore, students who obtained straight A's in the public examinations, which include the Pentaksiran Tingkatan Tiga, Sijil Pelajaran Malaysia, and
Sijil Tinggi Persekolahan Malaysia are also recognised. The much-anticipated announcement of the Student of the Year Award is also included. This ceremony usually takes place in April.

Recognition Ceremony 
This event is held annually in November to recognize and reward students who have contributed and served the school with dedication throughout the year. Among the recipients of the awards are the school captain, the head prefects, the chief editor of the editorial board and the class monitors of each class.

Prefects Installation Ceremony 

This annual ceremony is held in July for the upper-form school prefects. The retiring upper-form prefects hand over their duties to the newly elected prefects who pledge to uphold their new responsibility to the school. Per tradition, the retiring prefects light a candle for each of the new prefects as a symbol of the relinquishment of their responsibilities and duties to them. In return, the newly elected prefects give each of the retiring prefects a rose as a sign of gratitude and appreciation for their service and dedication to the school. This ceremony is held in the month of June as well for the lower-form school prefects.

Form Six Graduation Day Ceremony 
This annual graduation ceremony is held in October for the Form Six students. Certificates and awards for Form Six students who have displayed outstanding academic performance throughout the three semesters are distributed as well.

Sports Day 
Sports Day involves track and field events, participated in by the best athletes of each sport house, and the tug of war competition as well as the marching and cheerleading competitions between the five sport houses of the school. The marching competitions also involve the uniformed groups such as the Scouts and the Boys' Brigade. The winners of each sport-event category and of competitions among the sport houses as well as the Athlete of the Year for both the junior and the senior categories are announced. However, the most important announcement is of the overall winners of the annual sporting event among the five sport houses of the school.

Cross Country Run 
This annual run, held in January, is aimed at inculcating an athletic culture among students and raising awareness of the importance of staying healthy. This event usually involves approximately 1500 participating individuals, both students and teachers. Both the boys and girls have to run routes of seven kilometres and five kilometres, respectively. The top ten students of the four categories, the senior boys and girls as well as the junior boys and girls, will each receive a trophy.

Special evening events

Prefects' Night
A special night of different themes each year, the Prefects' Night is an event where all school prefects as well as teachers of the disciplinary board will dress their best. On this night, both retiring lower-form and upper-form prefects will be rewarded with a token of appreciation by the principal. They are also given a chance to dance, sing or play a musical instrument. The most-awaited part of the night is the nomination of individuals for the Best Dressed Award followed by a photo session of all prefects and teachers present. This night is typically held in August and organised by the Prefects' Board.

Fosis Night
Organised by the Form Six Council of All Saints School, this event is similar to the Prefects' Night. It is held to bid farewell to the graduating upper Form Six students.

Annual involvements

International Understanding Day 
An event held and organised by the Rotary Club, members of the school's Interact Club have participated actively in this event. All participating Interact Clubs from each school are tasked to choose a country as their theme to raise awareness for the chosen cause. Merchandise and homemade-food are sold and there are performances. Information about the country chosen by the schools is provided for the crowd to expand their knowledge about foreign countries and their culture, ultimately bringing the world closer together.

STEM competitions
For many years, students from All Saints School have been actively involved in various competitions, such as the Young Inventors Challenge (YIC), Kuala Lumpur Engineering Science Fair (PISTEK), National Mathematics and Science Olympiad, Singapore and Asian Schools Mathematical Olympiad (SASMO) and the Malaysia Brain Bee Challenge (MBBC).

MSU Running Maths Program

On 16 March 2019, SM All Saints participated in the MSU Running Maths Programme. A group of eight students, all from class 5 Amanah, were sent to represent the school.

Achievements and accolades

All Saints School Debate Team Hall of Fame
The debate team of All Saints School holds the record with eight consecutive years as the champions of the district as well as the state-level debate championship since 2012, thus representing the state of Sabah at the national level. The team continues to strive for victory at the national level and has sent representatives since 2003.

Sports
All Saints School has performed capably at the national level in cross country running, badminton, track and field, tennis, table tennis, squash, ten-pin bowling and sailing and has performed exceptionally in gymnastics at the international level.

Young Inventor's Journal
All Saints School was awarded the Champion (Group Category) of the 2019 National Young Inventor's Journal Competition held in Publika Solaris Dutamas, Kuala Lumpur after shortlisted from over 70 participating groups across the country and competing with 3 finalists.

Law Olympiad
In the 2019 District Law Olympiad Competition organized by HELP University, All Saints School managed to grasp the champion and first runner up after challenging 10 schools from the district of Kota Kinabalu. All students were from the class of 5 Amanah.

International relations
Global Generation Programme

Japan

All Saints has international links with the Arima Senior High School, in Sanda, Hyōgo, Japan through the Global Generation Programme which started in 2005 and continues bi-annually. The students from Arima Senior High School come from Japan to visit the school, learn the differences between Japanese and Malaysian life and culture here in Sabah, led by selected All Saints students. Students who are selected to participate in the student-exchange programme travel to Arima Senior High School in Japan, accompanied by teachers. The bi-annual programme allows All Saints students to experience the life and culture of Japan and to make Japanese friends.

Korea

In 2017, All Saints School initiated an international student-exchange programme with Bisan Middle School from Anyang, Gyeonggi, South Korea. This programme allows Malaysian students to develop a global perspective. The students exchange their knowledge of the language and culture of both countries. Teaching and learning methods in STEM fields as well as opinions on global warming, oceanic pollution and other crucial environmental issues abroad are exchanged. Furthermore, students are provided with the opportunity to experience the traditional food, cooking recipes, dances and traditional curiosities of both countries. This programme is held biannually for two weeks in the months of July and November. The programme involves approximately 20 students aged 14–16 from both schools.

Sakura Science Exchange Programme

Since 2015, All Saints School has established international relations with Hokkaido Sapporo Keisei High School in Japan through the Sakura Science Programme to promote establishment of a mutual research scheme and a high school-university international partnership (Rakuno Gakuen University of Hokkaido, Japan and Universiti Malaysia Sabah), to help raise the next generation who will contribute to solving Asian challenges of biodiversity and water resources. This programme is fully sponsored by the Japan Science and Technology Agency (JST).

Each year, five students who have excelled in their academics are selected to participate in this programme. These students spend a week in Sapporo, Japan accompanied by a teacher. Subsequently, selected students from Sapporo visit Kota Kinabalu. Students from both nations are also given the opportunity to exchange cultures and traditions during the stay with their foster families.

Krimbati Program

In January 2019, All Saints School carried out the Krimbati program. Krimbati comes from a Kwijau word for orangutan-like creatures. The aim of the programme was to spread awareness about the yaws disease which was common in some tropical countries. The school held a competition open to all students that had them forming groups of up to eight people to create a video on any subject, as long as the video had a moral lesson. Team "Peraturan Tigopulumpat" won the first place and a prize of RM100.

Nearby landmarks
All Saints School is located near some notable touristic, biological and athletic locations. Among them are the must-visit Kota Kinabalu City Mosque, located a six-minute walk away.

Furthermore, the Kota Kinabalu Wetland Centre (KKWC), is a 24-hectare mangrove forest located a five-minute drive away. This site widely known for its conservation efforts, earning it a Ramsar title.

Nearby Likas Stadium is usually used for sports training by students from All Saints School. It is also the venue for the school's annual Sports Day.

Notable alumni
Chong Kah Kiat – former Sabah state chief minister
Musa Aman – former Sabah state chief minister
Alex Lim Keng Liat – Malaysian swimmer
Christina Liew – Sabah deputy chief minister and state tourism minister

References 

Secondary schools in Malaysia
Anglican schools in Malaysia
Educational institutions established in 1903
1903 establishments in North Borneo
Publicly funded schools in Malaysia